The A11 is a road in Latvia connecting Liepāja to the border with Lithuania near the village of Rucava.

References 

A11